Ludovico Bertonio (1552 in Rocca Contrada – 3 August 1625 in Lima) was an Italian Jesuit missionary to South America.

Life
He entered the Society of Jesus in 1575. Sent to Peru six years later, he worked principally among the Aymara of southern Peru and of Bolivia.

Work

He wrote on the Aymara language. His earliest publications appeared under the title Arte breve de la lengua aymara para introducir el Arte grande de la misma lengua (Rome, 1603), also Arte y gramatica muy copiosa de la lengua aymara etc.

 Arte y Grammatica muy copiosa de la Lengua Aymara (1603)
 Arte Breve de la Lengua Aymara para Introducción del Arte Grande de la misma Lengua (1603)
 Vocabulario de la Lengua Aymara (1612)
 Arte de la Lengua Aymara. Con una Silva de Phrases de la misma lengua y declaracion en Romance (1612)
 Libro de la Vida y Milagros de Nuestro Señor Iesu Christo en dos Lenguas. Aymara y Romance (1612)
 Confessionario muy copioso en dos lenguas Aymara y Española, con una instrucción a cerca de los Siete Sacramentos de la Sancta Yglesia y otras varias cosas (1612)

The publications by Bertonio are rare. Julius Platzmann published in facsimile the Arte y grammatica of 1603 and the Vocabularies. The Peruvian historian Clemente Markham claimed that Bertonio invented the name "Aymara"; the Bolivian geographer Manuel Vicente Ballivian rejected this in a pamphlet.

References

 
Attribution
 The entry cites:
Torres Saldamando, Los antiguos Jesuitas del Peru (Lima, 1882);
Mendiburu, Diccionario (Lima, 1876), II:
Ballivian, Boletin de la Sociedad geografica de la Paz.

External links
Bertonio, Ludovico,  Vocabulario de la Lengua Ayamara, 1612
Fully digitized works by Ludovico Bertonio on Internet Archive
1984 Reprint of Vocabulario de la Lengua Aymara by Xavier Albó and Felix Layme

1552 births
1625 deaths
People from Arcevia
16th-century Italian Jesuits
Italian Roman Catholic missionaries
Roman Catholic missionaries in Bolivia
Italian expatriates in Peru
Italian expatriates in Bolivia
Jesuit missionaries in Peru